Majesty Yachts is a brand of superyachts and yachts manufactured by Gulf Craft, a global manufacturer of luxury yachts and fiberglass boats, in the United Arab Emirates.

History
The Majesty Yachts brand was launched in 2004. It has since served as a flagship brand for Gulf Craft, with a presence in major yachting markets  such as Europe, Asia-Pacific and the Americas.

Current Fleet
Majesty Yachts is represented by dealers across the Middle East, Asia, Americas, Europe and Asia-Pacific. The brand currently offers yachts and superyachts from 48 ft to 155 ft.

Yacht Collection: Majesty 48, Majesty 62 and Majesty 90 under the Yacht Collection
Superyacht Collection: Majesty 100, Majesty 110, Majesty 120, Majesty 122, Majesty 140 and Majesty 155

In addition, Gulf Craft is currently undergoing construction of the new Majesty 175, which will be "the largest mega yacht in the world to be built fully as a Commercial Yacht over 500 GT (gross tons) using advanced composite materials."

Events
Majesty Yachts boats and yachts have been exhibited at the Monaco Yacht Show, the Cannes Yachting Festival, boot Düsseldorf, the Dubai International Boat Show, Singapore Yacht Show, the Phuket International Boat Show, Shanghai International Boat Show, the Hainan Rendez-Vous, Xiamen International Boat Show, Eurasia Boat Show, Sydney Superyacht Show, Sanctuary Cove International Boat Show  and the Indonesia Yacht Show.

In 2011 Gulf Craft hosted the Yachting Lifestyle Show in Qatar. The Majesty 56, Majesty 77, and the Majesty 101 were showcased there.

Gulf Craft returned to Doha in 2013 for the Majesty Yachts Exclusive Preview event at The Pearl, Qatar. The event witnessed the Qatari premiere of Majesty 125 and a new Majesty 105. On October 26, 2013 Gulf Craft hosted an event aboard its Majesty 135 at the Dubai Creek Golf & Yacht Club. Gulf Craft demonstrated its support for Dubai’s 2020 World Expo bid by flying the Expo 2020 flag aboard the new yacht.

Gulf Craft staged another preview in Doha in 2014 . The event saw the Qatari premiere of the Majesty 135, Majesty 48, Gulf 75 Exp and the Waveshuttle 56, in addition to a number of other models of Majesty Yachts and 2014 models of the Oryx sport yachts and cruisers and Silvercraft fishing boats and family cruisers.

Gulf Craft hosted the first leisure marine show in Oman in 2014. Participating yachts included the Majesty 135, the Majesty 105 and 2014 models of the Oryx sport cruisers and Silvercraft leisure boat range.

Majesty Yachts - set locations
On July 5, 2011 the Majesty 125 yacht GRENADINES III was chosen as the location for the shooting of the video of the single “Name of Love” by Jean Roch, from his album “Music Saved My Life”.

On September 4, 2013 the crew of Dubai One filmed an episode for the 8th season of its “Out and About” show on board a Majesty 88. The shoot took place at Dubai International Marine Club, in the United Arab Emirates.

The Majesty 105 was used as a location for a luxury fashion shoot for Dubai Deluxe Autumn 2013 edition.

Awards
Majesty 135 – Winner of the 2013 Asia Boating Awards for Best Asia Built Yacht 
Majesty 88 – Winner of the 2012 China Yachting Award for Luxury Vessels over 80 ft 
Majesty 125 – Winner of the Arabian Gulf Yachting Award 2010 for Motor Yacht of the Year 
Majesty 121 – Winner of the Arabian Gulf Yachting Award 2008 for Best Motor Yacht in the Middle East over 100 ft

References

Yachts